Saru Castles (also spelled Soru) are two related fortifications located at 10 km in north east of the city of Semnan, Iran, on mountains of south and north of a valley called Kalāteh Sārū (literally "Saru Castle") or Mazra'eh-ye Sārū ("Saru Farm"). The northern castle, the Lesser Saru, is mostly in ruins. The southern castle, the Greater Saru, or simply the Saru Castle, is the main one and is relatively intact. It is 100 m higher than the Lesser Saru. The Greater Saru has triple defensive outer walls and an unusual double-bend main entrance way, and features a sophisticated water catchment area. The Lesser Saru was used to defend the Kalateh Saru natural springs from which water was pumped to the main castle.

The Saru Castles are believed to be used by Arsacids, Dabuyids of Tabaristan, Buyids, and eventually by the Nizari Ismailis, who built the current castle on the site of an earlier fortification. Saru is relatively understudied, and is a well-preserved case to study the architecture of the Ismaili castles. The Saru Castles are located at 80 km of Gerdkuh, another Ismaili castle of the Qumis region.

The etymology of the word Sārū is uncertain.

References

Castles of the Nizari Ismaili state
Castles in Iran
Buildings and structures in Semnan Province
Qumis (region)
National works of Iran